In Slovakia, taxes are levied by the state and local governments. Tax revenue stood at 18.732% of the country's gross domestic product in 2019. The tax-to-GDP ratio in the Slovakia increased by 0.4 percentage points from 34.3% in 2018 to 34.7% in 2019. The most important revenue sources for the state government are income tax, social security, value-added tax and corporate tax.

Income tax 
Income tax in Slovakia is levied at two different rates: 19% on income up to EUR 37,981.94 and 25% above EUR 37,981.94.  There is a personal allowance of EUR 3,803.33, which is disapplied when yearly income hits the 25% income tax bracket. In case of a non-working spouse a further allowance can be claimed.

Social Security contributions 
All employment income is mandated to pay into various social funds by law. In 2021 the rate for the employee is 13.4% and the employer contribution 35.2% of corresponding salary. Maximum monthly income base is 7,644 euros.

Persons resident in the EU are subject to the provisions of EC Regulation 883/2004, which provide for the applicable social security regulation in the case of cross-border activities. If non-EU residents work in Slovakia or Slovak nationals work in a third country, a bilateral social security agreement may provide for the applicable social security legislation.

Value-added tax 
Value added tax in Slovakia is provided by the Act No. 227/2007 Coll. on the value added tax and other amendments. This legal framework is based on the Sixth Council Directive 77/388/EEC and other European legal acts. The standard rate for value-added tax is 20% but there are exceptions where the reduced rate of 10% can be applied. The reduced VAT rate applies to goods such as pharmaceutical health products, printed materials and media and important groceries like bread, milk, and meat, which are classified under selected codes of the Common Customs Tariff.

Since 2009, domestic businesses have to register for value added tax if their turnover for the past 12 months has reached 49,790 Euro. 
Foreign businesses have to register before starting their activities that will be accounted in the value added tax. There are cases where the obligation of value added taxes is passed to a domestic purchaser and in this form the registration of this business entity is avoided. Considering long distance exchanges, the business must register for the value added tax in the case the value of goods supplied is more than 35,000 Euro per year.

General information about VAT 
The VAT rules are based on the principles of the Council Directive 2006/112/EC on the Common System of VAT. Subject to VAT are legal entities and individuals that carry on an economic activity.

Taxable events 

 the supply of goods and services for consideration within the territory of Slovakia by taxable persons acting as such
 the intra-Community acquisition of goods for consideration within the territory of Slovakia from another EU Member State
 the importation of goods into Slovakia

Taxable amount 
Total consideration charged for the supply, excluding VAT but including any excise duties or other taxes and fees.

Tax period 
The tax period for VAT is monthly or quarterly, based on turnover for the previous 12 consecutive calendar months. The compulsory tax period for new registered VAT payers is calendar months.

VAT Refund

A foreign entity that is not registered in the VAT system in the Slovak Republic can ask for a refund of VAT paid on services or goods provided by VAT payer in the territory of the country. It is important for VAT returns to be filed within 25 days from the last day of the taxable period. Value Added Tax returns must be filed every month. When the turnover does not exceed 100,000 Euro, tax can also be filed once every three months (quarterly based). In the scenario of excess value added tax, the refund is issued by the tax authorities within 30 days of the deadline for the VAT return.

Corporate income taxes

General information about corporate income tax

Residence 
In Slovakia a company is treated as resident if it has its legal seat or place of effective management in the Slovak Republic.

Tax period 
The calendar year is the most common tax period. The business (fiscal) year may occur as well.

Taxable income 
Companies which are resident in Slovakia are taxable on their worldwide income, including capital gains. This holds always, unless the company is exempted from tax. The taxable income is computed on the basis of the accounting profits and is adjusted for several items as described in the tax law.

Tax returns and assessment 
All taxpayers have to calculate the tax due in the corporate income tax return (self-assessment). The deadline for filing the return is by the end of third month following the end of the tax period. The filling deadline may be extended from three to six months if part of the taxpayer's tax base consists of foreign-source income.

Advance tax payment 
Advance tax refers to paying part of the taxes before the end of the financial year. It is also called the "pay-as-you-earn" scheme. Taxpayers can pay quarterly if the tax paid for previous year was between EUR 5,000 – EUR 16,600, or monthly, if the tax paid for previous year was higher than EUR 16,600. A new business entity established during the tax year (except if it is established by conversion, merger or division) is not required to make advance tax payments.

Deductions in taxes 
There is a general rule for deductions. Expenses incurred in obtaining, ensuring and maintaining taxable income are fully deductible, unless they are listed as non-deductible items or items which are deductible only up to a limit set by the law.

Carry-forward of losses 
Tax losses derived from 1 January 2014 to 31 December 2019 can be carried forward uniformly for four tax years. Tax losses derived before 2014 can no longer be carried forward.

With respect to tax loss reported for the tax period which begins no earlier than on 1 January 2020, new rules apply. The condition of equality of tax loss deduction shall not apply anymore and at the same time, the period for its deduction is extended from four years to five years. However, during the tax period, tax loss deduction of up to 50% of the tax base will be possible only, unless the taxpayer meets the definition of a “micro-taxpayer”.

Intercompany dividends 
Dividends which were paid out of profits gained from 1 January 2004 are not subject to any tax in the hands of the shareholders. Other dividends are taxed at the standard tax rate of 21% if distributed after 31 December 2013. New conditions for reduced corporate income tax rate of 15% were introduced on 1 January 2020. If these conditions are fulfilled then the reduced rate should be applied.

Corporate income tax 
Corporate income tax is levied at a rate of 21%. However, since 1 January 2021 taxpayers with taxable revenues up to EUR 49,790 per tax period are entitled to apply the reduced tax rate of 15%. This is the final tax burden on 2021 corporate profits in some cases because dividends paid out of 2021 profits are not taxed in the hands of shareholder if the shareholders are corporate and based in other than non-cooperating states.

Starting on 1 January 2018, a minimum corporate tax (so-called tax licenses), which was introduced in 2014, is abolished.

When setting up a business, there are some points that should be ensured:

 Prepare the registration for company income tax
 Record accounting
 Prepare company tax return for income tax
 Meet the payments deadline for income tax
 Meet the deadline for filing company tax return

Taxable profits of a corporation include:

 Money that comes from doing business or any other activity
 Money that comes from selling assets for a higher price than their costs
 Money that comes from other utilization of the property of the company

If the corporation is based in the Slovak Republic, the object of taxation is income from domestic and foreign sources. If the corporation is not based in the Slovak Republic, the object of taxation is only income from domestic sources.

International facets

Resident companies

Foreign income and capital gains 
Resident companies are subject to taxation. They have to tax their worldwide income and capital gains. Calculation of the taxable amount is the same as in the case of domestic income.

Dividend income paid by non-resident company 
Dividends paid out of profits generated starting on 1 January 2004 until 31 December 2016 are not subject to any Slovak tax. 

Dividends paid out of profits generated before 1 January 2004 are included in the taxable base of the recipient and taxed at a standard tax rate of 21%, or since 2020 there is a reduced rate of 15% which is applicable, unless rules implementing the EU Parent-Subsidiary Directive apply.

Dividends paid out of profits generated from 1 January 2017 should be included in a separate tax base and then taxable at 35% tax rate. This applies only if the distributing company is based in a non-cooperating state; otherwise, there are exemptions which can be applied.

Double taxation relief 
There is no one-sided double taxation relief provided. Double taxation relief can only be applied on the basis of tax treaties.

Non-resident companies

Taxable income 
Non-resident companies are subject to tax only on income gained from Slovak sources. All the taxation is provided by applying the same rules which are applicable to residents.

Withholding tax 
There are two withholding tax rates levied in Slovakia. The first is the generally applied tax rate of 19%. The second is an increased tax rate of 35% which applies if the recipient is a resident of a non-cooperating state. If the state is a non-cooperating state, it is not on the white-list. This white-list is published by the Slovak Ministry of Finance. Countries which are not on the white-list in Slovakia include: Bahamas, Barbados, British Virgin Islands, Cayman Islands, Panama, Seychelles, Kenya, Oman, etc.

Dividend paid by resident companies to non-resident 
There is no withholding tax on dividends which are paid to non-resident companies out of profits derived by the distributing company from 1 January 2004 until 31 December 2016.

Dividends paid out of profits which were generated before 1 January 2004 are (unless rules implementing the EU Parent-Subsidiary Directive apply) subject to a 19% final withholding tax, unless a reduced rate applies under a tax treaty. 

Dividends paid out of profits which were generated from 1 January 2017 should be a subject to a 35% withholding tax, however, only if the recipients are foreign companies based in a non-cooperating state.

Property tax 

Property or real estate tax is imposed on individuals or companies that are owners of a building, flat, land and non-residential spaces. According to the type of property there are three kinds of tax classifications: tax on land (land tax), tax on buildings (building tax) and tax on apartments (apartment tax).  The amount of annual property tax is mainly dependent on the area of the occupied land (measured in square meters), purpose of the property, number of floors etc. The amount of annual tax rate is highly effected by the specific tax rates that are set by municipal authorities. The property tax is compensated by the legal registered owner. In the case that this registered owner is not determined, the burden of the tax falls to the person who uses the property. The property tax is under the rule of the Act on Local Taxes.

Tax reform after the Communist era 
After the end of communism, a wide range of reforms were made to bring the country from a government-run economy to a free-market economy. A large tax reform was enacted in the year 2003. It included a wide range of reforms including abolishing most deductions on the income tax, and bringing it down to a flat rate of 19% instead of a progressive rate from 10% to 38%. The corporate tax rate fell from 25% to 19%. Furthermore, the two rates of VAT 14% and 20% were merged into one band of 19%. All inheritance and gift taxes were also abolished.

Road tax and toll 
Road tax and toll payment in Slovakia is compulsory. These are paid for with vignettes, purchased for periods of one week to one year. Cost is determined by the weight of the vehicle. Additional costs are incurred for trailers attached to vehicles.

Vehicles below 3.5 tons 
Persons travelling on a highway or speedway in Slovakia with a vehicle with a maximum permissible total weight below 3.5 tons are obliged to pay road tax by buying a vignette. There is a traffic sign on each border crossing informing the driver of this obligation but no further reference within the country.

Types of vignettes 
On 1 December 2015 the Slovak Republic commissioned the electronic system of vignette payment collection and records (hereinafter referred to only as the “electronic vignette system”) for the use of the specified sections of motorways and expressways (hereinafter referred to as the "specified road sections"). Switching the system of vignette payment collection and records into electronic form meant a change in the vignette form – the physical motorway stickers were replaced by vignettes in electronic form.

Currently, there are three types of electronic vignettes:
1-year vignette - valid from 1 January of the relevant calendar year (or the day of payment for the vignette by the customer in the relevant calendar year) until 31 January of the following calendar year
365-day vignette - valid for 365 days (including the day of starting date) from the date specified by the customer for the next 365 days.
30-day vignette - valid for 30 days (including the day of starting date) from the date specified by the customer
10-day vignette - valid for 10 days (including the day of starting date) from the date specified by the customer

If a trailer category O1 or O2 is attached (to a tractor vehicle within the vehicle categories M1, N1 or N1G, and the maximum permissible weight of the vehicle and trailer exceed 3.5 tons, drivers have to buy additional vignette for heavy vehicle combinations.

Prices 
For 2021 the prices (including VAT) are the following:
 1-year vignette - EUR 50
365-day vignette - EUR 50
 30-day vignette - EUR 14
 10-day vignette - EUR 10

Vehicles over 3.5 tons 
Since January 1, 2010 all vehicles above 3.5 tons maximum permissible total weight (including busses) must pay electronic toll when driving in Slovakia. Information about this obligation is stated by a traffic sign on each border crossing. Generally all main corridors (national roads) and highways are toll liable. A company named SkyToll A.S. runs a system based on a combination of GPS, GSM and DSRC technology. Each driver has to stop at one of the distribution points located on each border crossing used by heavy traffic and register the vehicle. The driver obtains an electronic on-board unit.

References

External links 
 Eznamka - electronic vignette system
 Web page about the electronic toll system in Slovakia
 Correct usage of the on-board unit
 Toll liable roads in Slovakia
 National highway company of Slovakia - information about vignettes
 Correct usage of a vignette
 Road tax liable highways in Slovakia

Road transport in Slovakia
Car costs
Slovakia

hu:Adózás Szlovákiában
fi:Verotus Slovakiassa
sv:Beskattning i Slovakien